Musik, dans & party 7 is a 1992 studio album by Sten & Stanley.

Track listing
"Tusen tack för alla dessa år" (P. Sahlin)
"Sugartime" (C. Philips - O. Echols - E. Sandström)
"En vän som du" (T. Gunnarsson - E. Lord)
"Dansa en dans med mig" ("Ten Guitars") (G. Mills - S. Andersson)
"Da Doo Ron Ron" (P. Spector - E. Greenwich - J. Barry - L. Löfstrand - Y. Selberg)
"Andante, Andante" (B. Andersson - B. Ulvaeus - I. Forsman)
"Vid din trädgårdsgrind" (P. Sahlin)
"Vissa blommor vissnar aldrig" (M. Ekwall)
"Åh, Carol" ("Oh! Carol") (H. Greenfield - N. Sedaka - B. Carlsson)
"Du sa farväl" (E. Nilsson - A. Svensson)
"Passar det inte så går jag" (T. Gunnarsson - E. Lord)
"Nu längtar jag hem" ("Detroit City") (D. Dill - M. Tills - O. Bergman)
"Över land, över hav" (S. Nilsson - K. Almgren)
"Angeline" ("Bernardine") (J. Mercer - I. Forsman)

Charts

References 

1992 albums
Sten & Stanley albums